Abdoulaye Loukoumanou (born 31 December 1973) is a retired Togolese football midfielder. He was a squad member for the 1998 African Cup of Nations.

References

1973 births
Living people
Togolese footballers
Togo international footballers
Paris FC players
FC Istres players
Angoulême Charente FC players
Association football midfielders
Togolese expatriate footballers
Expatriate footballers in France
Togolese expatriate sportspeople in France
21st-century Togolese people